The Parliamentary Evangelical Front or more simply known as the Evangelical Caucus (known in Portuguese as Frente Parlamentar Evangélica and  Bancada Evangélica respectively) is a loosely organized group of Protestant, Evangelical, and Pentecostal lawmakers in the Brazilian government and legislature.

If considered a political party, the Evangelical Caucus would be the third largest in the Brazilian government, surpassed only by the Brazilian Democratic Movement and the Workers' Party. It is a proeminent feature of Conservatism in Brazil.

Leadership
The evangelical caucus has no formalized leadership; however João Campos de Araújo, Anthony Garotinho, Eduardo Cunha, Lincoln Portela, and Magno Malta were considered the unofficial leaders of the caucus in 2013.

Membership
The Evangelical Caucus of Brazil has no defined standard of membership but is generally open to all Protestant lawmakers in the Brazilian legislature, including mainline denominations as well as members of evangelical and Pentecostal movements.

The caucus was formed especially because Brazil's fast growing Protestant population was underrepresented in government, and as is the norm Catholic and non-religious politicians are not allowed to be members. Converative Catholic politicians are usually not considered to be part of the evangelical caucus, certain politicians such as Hugo Leal and Jair Bolsonaro often collaborate with the caucus.

Although the Evangelical Caucus is often perceived by the media, its members, and supporters to be conservative/right wing, it is worth noting that a few members are affiliated with left-wing politics in Brazil, such as Benedita da Silva, Marina Silva, and Walter Pinheiro.

Influence on politics
The evangelical front is often seen as part of the rising Evangelical influence in politics in Latin America. The evangelical vote was seen as key in the Impeachment of Dilma Rousseff and the election of Jair Bolsonaro in the 2018 election.

Prominent members

Senate of Brazil
The following past and present members of the Brazilian Senate that are/were affiliated with the Evangelical caucus

Chamber of Deputies
The following past and present members of the Chamber of Deputies that are/were affiliated with the Evangelical caucus

See also
Conservatism in Brazil
Evangelical political parties in Latin America

References

Evangelicalism in Brazil
Conservatism in Brazil
Far-right politics in Brazil